KCTP-LP (102.1 FM) was a radio station licensed to Pablo, Montana, United States. The station was owned by the Confederated Salish & Kootenai Tribes Disaster & Emergency Services.

The station's broadcast license was cancelled by the Federal Communications Commission on December 12, 2012, as the station had been silent for longer than twelve months.

References

External links
 

CTP-LP
CTP-LP
Native American radio
Radio stations disestablished in 2012
Defunct radio stations in the United States
2012 disestablishments in Montana
CTP-LP